The Josko Arena, formerly Fill Metallbau Stadion, is a football stadium in Ried im Innkreis, Austria.  It is the home ground of SV Ried. The stadium holds 7,680 spectators and was built in 2003. The stadium was renamed in "Josko Arena", after the sponsor "Josko".

Gallery

References

Football venues in Austria
Sports venues in Upper Austria